Dae Kwang is a Soen Sa Nim and is the current guiding teacher of the Providence Zen Center. He was ordained as a monk in 1987 and received Dharma transmission from Seung Sahn in 1996. He also serves as head abbot of the entire lineage, ranking just below Soeng Hyang (who is guiding teacher).

See also
Timeline of Zen Buddhism in the United States

References

Living people
Seon Buddhist monks
Kwan Um School of Zen
American Zen Buddhists
Zen Buddhist spiritual teachers
1944 births